The 78th annual Venice International Film Festival was held from 1 to 11 September 2021. South Korean director Bong Joon-ho was appointed as the President of the Jury, marking the first time a South Korean director has been picked as the festival's top juror. Serena Rossi hosted the opening and closing nights. The Golden Lion was awarded to Happening directed by Audrey Diwan.

Jury
Main Competition (Venezia 78)

 Bong Joon-ho, South Korean director and screenwriter (Jury President)
 Saverio Costanzo, Italian director and screenwriter
 Virginie Efira, Belgian actress
 Cynthia Erivo, British actress and singer
 Sarah Gadon, Canadian actress
 Alexander Nanau, Romanian-German documentary director
 Chloé Zhao, Chinese director and screenwriter 

Horizons

 Jasmila Žbanić, Bosnian director  (Jury President)
 Mona Fastvold, Norwegian director 
 Shahram Mokri, Iranian director  
 Josh Siegel, director of the cinema department of MoMA  
 Nadia Terranova, Italian novelist

Luigi De Laurentiis Award for a Debut Film

 Uberto Pasolini, Italian director and producer (Jury President)
 Martin Schweighofer, Austrian film critic
 Amalia Ulman, Argentine visual artist

Official selection

In Competition
The following films were selected for the main international competition:

Highlighted title indicates Golden Lion winner.

Out of Competition
The following films were selected to be screened out of competition:

Horizons
The following films were selected for the Horizons section:

Awards

Official selection
The following official awards were presented at the 78th Edition:

In Competition
Golden Lion: Happening by Audrey Diwan
Grand Jury Prize: The Hand of God by Paolo Sorrentino
Silver Lion: The Power of the Dog by Jane Campion
Volpi Cup for Best Actress: Penélope Cruz for Parallel Mothers
Volpi Cup for Best Actor: John Arcilla for On the Job: The Missing 8
Golden Osella for Best Screenplay: The Lost Daughter by Maggie Gyllenhaal
Special Jury Prize: Il buco by Michelangelo Frammartino
Marcello Mastroianni Award: Filippo Scotti for The Hand of God

Horizons (Orizzonti)
Best Film: Pilgrims by Laurynas Bareisa
Best Director: Full Time by Éric Gravel
Special Jury Prize: El Gran Movimiento by Kiro Russo
Best Actress: Laure Calamy for Full Time
Best Actor: Piseth Chhun for White Building
Best Screenplay: 107 Mothers by Peter Kerekes
Best Short Film: The Bones by Cristóbal León and Joaquín Cociña
Armani Beauty Audience Award: The Blind Man Who Did Not Want to See Titanic by Teemu Nikki

Lion of the Future

Luigi De Laurentiis Award for a Debut Film: Imaculat by George Chiper-Lillemark and Monica Stan

Autonomous sections
The following collateral awards were conferred to films of the autonomous sections:

Venice International Critics' Week
Grand Prize: Zalava by Arsalan Amiri
Mario Serandrei: They Carry Death by Samuel M. Delgado and Helena Girón
Best Short Film: Inchei by Federico Demattè
Best Director: Inchei by Federico Demattè
Best Technical Contribution: L'Incanto by Chiara Caterina

Other collateral awards
The following collateral awards were conferred to films of the official selection:

 Arca CinemaGiovani Award
Best Italian Film: The Hand of God by Paolo Sorrentino
Venezia 78 Best Film: Happening by Audrey Diwan
Authors under 40 Award
Best Director: Vera Dreams of the Sea by Kaltrina Krasniqi
Best Screenplay: Imaculat by George Chiper-Lillemark and Monica Stan
BNL Gruppo BNP Paribas People's Choice Award: Deserto Particular by Aly Muritiba
Brian Award: Happening by Audrey Diwan
Casa Wabi – Mantarraya Award: Imaculat by George Chiper-Lillemark and Monica Stan
CICT - UNESCO "Enrico Fulchignoni" Award: Amira by Mohamed Diab
Edipo Re Award:
Al Garib by Amer Fakher Eldin
Vera Dreams of the Sea by Kaltrina Krasniqi
Europa Cinemas Label Award: Californie by Alessandro Cassigoli and Casey Kauffman
Fanheart3 Award
Graffetta d'Oro for Best Film: Freaks Out by Gabriele Mainetti
Nave d’Argento for Best OTP: Mona Lisa and the Blood Moon by Ana Lily Amirpour
VR Fan Experience: Knot: A Trilogy by Glen Neath and David Rosenberg
Special Mention: Old Henry by Potsy Ponciroli
FEDIC Award: Il buco by Michelangelo Frammartino
Special mention: La Ragazza Ha Volato by Wilma Labate
 FIPRESCI Awards:
Best Film (main competition): Happening by Audrey Diwan
Best Film (other sections): Zalava by Arsalan Amiri
Fondazione Mimmo Rotella Award: Mario Martone and Toni Servillo for The King of Laughter
Francesco Pasinetti Award
Best Film: The Hand of God by Paolo Sorrentino
Best Actor:
Leonardo Di Costanzo for Ariaferma
Toni Servillo for The Hand of God and The King of Laughter
Best Actress: Teresa Saponangelo for The Hand of God
GdA Director's Award: Imaculat by George Chiper-Lillemark and Monica Stan 
Green Drop Award: Il buco by Michelangelo Frammartino
Leoncino d'Oro Award: Freaks Out by Gabriele Mainetti
Lizzani Award: Freaks Out by Gabriele Mainetti
Premio Fondazione Fai Persona Lavoro Ambiente: El Gran Movimiento by Kiro Russo
Special mention: Costa Brava by Mounia Akl (treatment of issues related to environment)
Special mention: 7 Prisoners by Alexandre Moratto (treatment of issues related to work)
Special mention: Full Time by Éric Gravel (treatment of issues related to work)
NUOVOIMAIE TALENT AWARD
Best New Young Actor: Filippo Scotti for The Hand of God
Best New Young Actress: Aurora Giovinazzo for Freaks Out
La Pellicola d'Oro Award
Best Visual Effects: Maurizio Corridori for Freaks Out
Best Gaffer: Loris Felici for Freaks Out
Best Camera Operator: Luca Massa for Il buco
Best Costume Tailoring: Tirelli for The King of Laughter
Premio Soundtrack Stars Award 
Best Soundtrack: Freaks Out by Gabriele Mainetti
Special Mention: Mona Lisa and the Blood Moon by Ana Lily Amirpour
Lifetime Achievement Award: Ornella Vanoni
Premio UNIMED: The Hand of God by Paolo Sorrentino
Premio Fair Play al Cinema - Vivere da Sportivi: Il buco by Michelangelo Frammartino
Special mention: The Card Counter by Paul Schrader
Queer Lion: The Last Chapter by Gianluca Matarrese
RB Casting Award: Aurora Giovinazzo for Freaks Out
Sfera 1932 Award: The Box by Lorenzo Vigas
SIGNIS Award: Another World by Stéphane Brizé
Special mention: The Hand of God by Paolo Sorrentino
Smithers Foundation Award "Ambassador of Hope": Life of Crime 1984-2020 by Jon Alpert
“Sorriso Diverso Venezia Award” XI edition
Best Italian Film: Freaks Out by Gabriele Mainetti
Best Foreign Film: 7 Prisoners by Alexandre Moratto 
10th INTERFILM Award for Promoting Interreligious Dialogue: Amira by Mohamed Diab
Verona Film Club Award: Erasing Frank by Gàbor Fabricius

Special Awards
Golden Lion For Lifetime Achievement: Roberto Benigni and Jamie Lee Curtis

References

External links
 

2021 film festivals
2021 in Italian cinema
78
Film